Julián Vicente Araujo Zúñiga (born 13 August 2001) is a professional footballer who plays as a right-back for Primera Federación club Barcelona Atlètic. Born in the United States, he represents the Mexico national team.

Youth
Araujo was born in Lompoc, California, and is of Mexican descent. He attended Lompoc High School. After two years at Lompoc High School, he left home and joined Barça Residency Academy in Casa Grande, Arizona in 2017.

In March 2017, Araujo had committed to playing college soccer at the University of California, Santa Barbara from 2018 onward.

Club career

LA Galaxy II
Araujo made his professional debut in a 2–2 draw with Seattle Sounders FC 2 on 4 October 2018, coming on as an 88th-minute substitute for Nate Shultz.

LA Galaxy
On 1 March 2019, LA Galaxy acquired Araujo after trading $50,000 of Targeted Allocation Money to Colorado Rapids to gain the first spot in the Waivers Order.

Araujo made 108 total appearances with the Galaxy, scoring once in the regular season and again in the playoffs. He became a regular starter beginning in 2019 and finished 2021 and 2022 as the team's defender of the year.

Barcelona
On 1 February 2023, FC Barcelona and LA Galaxy agreed on a transfer for Araujo. The paperwork, however, was delivered 18 seconds late, and the deal was left in limbo after FIFA rejected the transfer but the Court of Arbitration for Sport overruled. Ultimately, by 17 February Araujo was transferred to Barcelona.

International career

United States
Araujo was eligible to play for the United States or Mexico.

After an injury to Ayo Akinola, Araujo was named to the 2019 FIFA U-20 World Cup squad to represent the United States under-20.

Araujo was called into the United States national soccer team by Gregg Berhalter for the January 2020 camp, but did not make an official match appearance. He was called up again in December 2020 for a game against El Salvador, in which he made his senior level debut. Araujo was named to the final 20-player United States under-23 roster for the 2020 CONCACAF Men's Olympic Qualifying Championship in March 2021.

On 18 June 2021, Araujo was named to the preliminary 59-player USMNT roster for the 2021 CONCACAF Gold Cup but was left off of the final roster on 1 July 2021. Berhalter cited Araujo's dual citizenship and him not feeling ready to become cap-tied to the USMNT.

Mexico

On 13 August 2021, sports media in Mexico reported that Araujo himself had filed and submitted the one-time switch to FIFA in order to join Mexico. As of 4 October 2021 FIFA officially approved Araujo's case.

On 27 November 2021, Araujo was included in the Mexico national football team call-up by Gerardo Martino for a friendly match against Chile set to take place on 8 December. He was given a starting berth in Mexico's 2–2 draw, playing the full 90 minutes. In making his debut, Araujo became the third player in the history of the Mexico–United States rivalry in having represented both national teams alongside Martín Vásquez and Edgar Castillo.

Career statistics

Club

International

Honours
United States U20
CONCACAF U-20 Championship: 2018

Individual
MLS All-Star: 2021, 2022

References

External links

 

2001 births
Living people
Association football defenders
Citizens of Mexico through descent
Dual internationalists (football)
Mexican footballers
Mexico international footballers
American soccer players
American sportspeople of Mexican descent
LA Galaxy II players
LA Galaxy players
People from Lompoc, California
Soccer players from California
Sportspeople from Santa Barbara County, California
United States men's youth international soccer players
United States men's under-20 international soccer players
USL Championship players
United States men's under-23 international soccer players
Major League Soccer players